Züri-Metzgete (Zürich German;) was a European Classic cycle race held annually in Zürich, Switzerland, and continued as a non-professional mass participation event from 2007 until 2014. It was a race with a long history dating back to 1914, on a demanding course in the hilly region around Zürich. In its heyday the race was considered the sixth monument of cycling, alongside the five most prestigious one-day races on the calendar (Milan–San Remo, Tour of Flanders, Paris–Roubaix, Liège–Bastogne–Liège and the Tour of Lombardy). It was the most prominent of the summer classics.

The Züri-Metzgete was included in every edition of the former UCI Road World Cup which ran from 1989 to 2004, and a leg of the inaugural UCI ProTour in 2005. In 2005 the race was moved to the end of the season for the first time in its history. The 2007 edition of the race was canceled after organizers failed to attract enough sponsors in the wake of several doping scandals in international cycling. In 2008, the race was held on September 7, but the format has been changed to an amateur competition.

History and background
The Züri-Metzgete was first held in 1914 and has been held annually since 1917, including the second World War years, giving it the longest continued existence of any of cycling's major races. Originally, the race was billed as "Meisterschaft von Zürich" (Championship of Zurich), and this designation is still being used in some places. However, the colloquial expression "Züri Metzgete" soon became popular and has long been adapted by the organisers themselves and also by the UCI. "Züri" is Swiss dialect for Zurich. "Metzgete" (from "metzgern", to butcher) is a dialect word as well and a tongue-in-cheek reference to the supposedly ruthless character of the race. (Originally, a "Metzgete" is a special form of agricultural festivity usually held in autumn when farmers had to reduce their livestock to get through the winter. The fresh meat was then sold and distributed in barbecue-like village festivals.)

For many years the event was held in early May, not an ideal date as the majority of the top classic riders were jaded after contesting the "Monuments" in March and April. Also during the 1960s, 1970s and 1980s the race was often held the day after the Rund um den Henninger Turm in Frankfurt and this affected the quality of the field and the racing. In 1988 the race was switched to a date in mid August which attracted many of the Tour de France stars and gave the race a new lease of life. The 2005 edition of the race has been switched to yet another new date in early October, as the UCI rearranged the cycling calendar to bring the World Championships a few weeks earlier in the season.

In the early days, the Züri-Metzgete was dominated by home riders with the race being won on 34 occasions by the Swiss in the first 41 editions of the race between 1914 and 1956. The most notable foreign winner in this period was Gino Bartali. In 1946, the Italian beat arch rival Fausto Coppi in a contentious race, the two Italians rode together at a breakneck pace shaking off all their rivals with Bartali winning in controversial circumstances, sprinting away while Coppi was tightening his toe straps. Many people say this incident was the start of the "war" between Bartali and Coppi.

Many of the Swiss winners at this time never went on to win another major race but two of Switzerland's greatest riders Ferdinand Kübler (1943) and Hugo Koblet (1952 and 1954) were triumphant at Zürich in this era, another Swiss Henri Suter set the record for the most victories at six between 1919 and 1929. After 1956 the race winners have become more international with only five Swiss winners in this period compared to 15 victories for Italy and 13 for Belgium. The quality of the race winners has been very high with classic specialists such as Paolo Bettini, Francesco Moser, Roger De Vlaeminck, Freddy Maertens, Giuseppe Saronni and Johan Museeuw all winning while the switch to an August date in 1988 allowed Tour de France riders such as Lance Armstrong, Jan Ullrich and Laurent Dufaux to do well in the race.

The route
The present day race starts and finishes in Zürich, in previous years the finish was on the Oerlikon velodrome in Zürich but that was abandoned a number of years ago. The race is held over a distance of 241 km with over 3000 metres of climbing, consisting of one 72.5 km lap and four 42.1 km circuits, this shorter lap includes four ascents of both the Pfannenstiel and Forch climbs, the final climb of the Pfannenstiel is just 15 km from the finish in Zürich and is often the launching point for the winning move in the race. Between 1993 and 1999 the race started in Basel and finished in Zürich and was known as the Grand Prix Suisse.

Winners

List of winners

Multiple winners

Wins per country

External links
 Official website

References

 
Classic cycle races
Cycle races in Switzerland
UCI ProTour races
UCI Road World Cup races
Recurring sporting events established in 1914
1914 establishments in Switzerland
Recurring sporting events disestablished in 2006
Defunct cycling races in Switzerland
2006 disestablishments in Switzerland
Autumn events in Switzerland
Super Prestige Pernod races